In cryptography, Woo–Lam refers to various computer network authentication protocols designed by Simon S. Lam and Thomas Woo. The protocols enable two communicating parties to authenticate each other's identity and to exchange session keys, and involve the use of a trusted key distribution center (KDC) to negotiate between the parties. Both symmetric-key and public-key variants have been described. However, the protocols suffer from various security flaws, and in part have been described as being inefficient compared to alternative authentication protocols.

Public-key protocol

Notation 

The following notation is used to describe the algorithm:
 - network nodes.
 - public key of node .
 - public-key encryption using key .
 - digital signature using key .
 - random session key chosen by the KDC.
 - concatenation.

It is assumed that all parties know the KDC's public key.

Message exchange 

The original version of the protocol had the identifier  omitted from lines 5 and 6, which did not account for the fact that  is unique only among nonces generated by A and not by other parties. The protocol was revised after the authors themselves spotted a flaw in the algorithm.

See also 

 Kerberos
 Needham–Schroeder protocol
 Otway–Rees protocol

References 

Computer network security
Authentication methods